Belair National Bank was a bank headquartered in Bowie, Maryland. It operated 4 branches. In 1977, it was acquired by Citizens National Bank.

History
The bank was formed on April 3, 1964.  

On January 3, 1977, the bank was acquired by Citizens National Bank.

References

Defunct banks of the United States
Banks established in 1964
1964 establishments in Maryland
1977 disestablishments in Maryland